Jimmy Bermingham was an Irish footballer who played as forward during the 1920s and 1930s.

Bermingham was an outside right during this era in the League of Ireland and was part of the Bohemians team of 1927/28 who won every trophy on offer that season – League of Ireland, FAI Cup, Shield and Leinster Senior Cup. He was top scorer for Bohs the previous season with 23 goals in all competitions

He won 1 full international cap for Irish Free State, making his debut against Belgium in 1929 at Dalymount Park.

Honours
Bohemians
 League of Ireland: 1927–28, 1929–30
 FAI Cup: 1928
 League of Ireland Shield: 1928, 1929
 Aciéries d'Angleur Trophy: 1929

References

Living people
Irish Free State association footballers
Republic of Ireland association footballers
Association football forwards
Irish Free State international footballers
Northern Ireland amateur international footballers
League of Ireland players
Bohemian F.C. players
Year of birth missing (living people)